The OPV-80 class is a class of offshore patrol vessels that are currently operated by the Chilean Navy and Colombian National Navy.

The Argentine Navy have also expressed an interest in building these ships.

History
The design of the PZM was developed by Fassmer GmbH & Co. KG, a German company to meet the Chilean Navy's requirements under the Danubio IV project. The contract for ASMAR to build the PZMs was signed on May 20, 2005, with Northrop Grumman, Sisdef (a consortium of BAE Systems and shipbuilder ASMAR) and Rohde & Schwarz participating as main subcontractors at a cost of US$54 million to be commissioned by 2012. The vessels will be operated by the Coast Guard Service of the Chilean Navy and they will conduct patrol missions in Chile's exclusive economic zone (EEZ). The design of the Proyecto Patrulleros de Zona Marítima is being promoted by Chile as a common platform for South American navies through the Proyecto Patrullero de Alta Mar Regional (or Regional Offshore Patrol Ship) committee.

Colombia 
Colombia ordered three vessels to be built at its COTECMAR shipyard in Cartagena, out of six planned until 2020.

Ships in class

See also
 POVZEE
 BVL

References

External links

 Astilleros y Maestranzas de la Armada
 Armar.cl OPV-80 in Action video
 ASMAR PZM specifications
 Fassmer's 80 m Offshore Patrol Vessel
 Proyecto Patrulleros de Zona Marítima (PZM)

Patrol vessels of the Chilean Navy
Patrol vessels of the Argentine Navy
Patrol vessels of the Colombian Navy
Ships built in Chile
Ships built in Argentina
Patrol ship classes